Roni Rosadi (born 24 March 1991) is an Indonesian professional footballer who plays as a full-back for Liga 2 club PSIM Yogyakarta.

Club career

Mitra Kukar
In 2018, Roni Rosadi signed a one-year contract with Indonesian Liga 1 club Mitra Kukar. He made his debut on 8 April 2018 in a match against Persib Bandung at the Gelora Bandung Lautan Api Stadium, Bandung.

Semen Padang
He was signed for Semen Padang to play in Liga 1 on the 2019 season. Rosadi made his debut on 20 August 2019 in a match against Persela Lamongan at the Haji Agus Salim Stadium, Padang.

Badak Lampung
He was signed for Badak Lampung to play in Liga 2 in the 2020 season. This season was suspended on 27 March 2020 due to the COVID-19 pandemic. The season was abandoned and was declared void on 20 January 2021.

Honours

Club
Semen Padang U-21
 Indonesia Super League U-21 runner-up: 2010–11

References

External links
 Roni Rosadi at Soccerway
 Roni Rosadi at Liga Indonesia

1991 births
Living people
Indonesian footballers
Association football fullbacks
Liga 1 (Indonesia) players
Liga 2 (Indonesia) players
Badak Lampung F.C.
Badak Lampung F.C. players
Gresik United players
Mitra Kukar players
Semen Padang F.C. players
People from Bandar Lampung
Sportspeople from Lampung